The Arlington Hotel was a hotel in Washington, D.C. which stood from 1868 to 1912. It was considered the most opulent hotel in the District of Columbia during the post-Civil War era, a "distinctive but low-keyed example of the Second Empire style."  It was built in 1868 and expanded in 1889. It was the Washington residence of many senators and Congressmen, including three-term Speaker of the House Thomas Brackett Reed and Vice President Garret Hobart. Reed died in the Arlington Hotel in December 1902 of Bright's disease.

The Arlington Hotel was also a waystation for international notables such as King Albert I of Belgium, Grand Duke Alexei Alexandrovich of Russia and Emperor Pedro II of Brazil as well as industrialists and financial magnates Andrew Carnegie and J. P. Morgan.

In 1899, The Successful American magazine recognized the Arlington Hotel as "one of the foremost hotels of the country" and wrote that the hotel had "sheltered every preeminent American for years and has been the temporary home of every potentate" visiting Washington, D.C. in the era.

The hotel was demolished in 1912 in order to build an even larger hotel. However, financing fell through for the new building and the land was sold to the U.S. Government in 1918, which built what became the offices of the United States Department of Veterans Affairs.

References

Hotels established in 1868
Hotels disestablished in 1912
Hotels in Washington, D.C.
Defunct hotels in the United States
Buildings and structures demolished in 1912